The National Defence Commission of the Democratic People's Republic of Korea (NDC) was the highest state institution for military and national defence leadership in North Korea, which also served as the highest governing institution of the country from 1998 until 2016 when it was replaced by the State Affairs Commission.

History
The National Defence Commission started as the National Defence Commission of the Central People's Committee of the Democratic People's Republic of Korea which was created on 27 December 1972 by the 1972 Constitution as one of the commissions that were subordinate to the Central People's Committee.

It was also designated as the "supreme military leadership institution of state power."

National Defense Commission was separated from the Central People's Committee (which was dissolved and replaced by the Cabinet) at the first session of the 10th convocation of the Supreme People's Assembly and became the highest governing institution in North Korea on 5 September 1998 through an amendment of the 1972 Constitution that abolished the office of President of North Korea. It was designated as the "supreme military leadership and overall national defence management institution of state power." Since an amendment of the 1972 Constitution on 9 April 2009, the National Defence Commission was designated as the "supreme national defence leadership institution of state power."

The National Defence Commission continued to be the highest leadership body in North Korea until 29 June 2016 when an amendment to the 1972 Constitution created the State Affairs Commission of the Democratic People's Republic of Korea, which was designated as the new highest leadership body in the country, with the National Defence Commission being disbanded to be convened only during times of war.

Functions
The 1972 Constitution mandated the National Defence Commission to be one of the commissions that are subordinate to the Central People's Committee in order to assist it in its work.

The 1992 amendment to the 1972 Constitution separated the National Defence Commission from the Central People's Committee and was designated the following functions as the "supreme military leadership institution of state power":
 Guide the overall armed forces and defense-building work of the State
 Appoint or dismiss key military officials
 Institute military ranks and promote officers above the general-grade officer rank
 Proclaim a state of emergency and mobilization order
 Issue decisions and orders

The 1998 amendment to the 1972 Constitution made the National Defence Commission as the highest governing institution in North Korea and was designated the following functions as the "supreme military leadership and overall national defence management institution of state power":
 Direct the whole armed forces and defence upbuilding of the State
 Establish or abolish central bodies in the field of national defence
 Appoint or remove important military cadres
 Enact military ranks and confer military ranks higher than a general
 Proclaim a state of war and mobilization order in the country
 Issue orders and decisions

The 2009 amendment to the 1972 Constitution relegated the National Defence Commission to a supervisory role as certain powers were introduced for the chairman of the National Defence Commission. The following functions were mandated for the National Defence Commission as the "supreme national defence leadership institution of state power":
 Establish important policies of the state for carrying out the military-first revolutionary line
 Guide the overall armed forces and defense-building work of the state
 Supervise the status of executing the orders of the chairman of the National Defence Commission of the Democratic People's Republic of Korea and the decisions and directives of the National Defence Commission, and establish relevant measures
 Rescind the decisions and directives of state organs that run counter to the orders of the chairman of the National Defence Commission of the Democratic People's Republic of Korea and to the decisions and directives of the National Defence Commission
 Establish or abolish central organs of the national defense sector
 Institute military titles and confer military titles above the general grade officer rank
 Issue decisions and directives

The National Defence Commission is responsible to the Supreme People's Assembly.

As a defense issues guider and coordinator, the security organizations in North Korea are subordinate to the Commission and among them are the Korean People's Army, the Ministry of People's Armed Forces and the Ministry of State Security and the Ministry of Social Security.

Organization
From 1972 until 2012, the National Defence Commission consisted of a chairman, first vice chairman, vice chairmen and members.

The Chairman of the National Defence Commission was the head of the commission, and was the de facto highest official in North Korea from 1998 until 2009 and the de jure supreme leader of North Korea from 2009 until 2012. The chairman of the National Defence Commission also served as the supreme commander of the Korean People's Army. From 1972 until 1992, the President was the ex officio chairman of the National Defence Commission. Since 1992, the chairman of the National Defence Commission was no longer required to be the President and was elected by the Supreme People's Assembly.

The first vice chairman, the vice chairmen and the members of the National Defence Commission were elected by the Supreme People's Assembly based on the proposal of the President from 1972 until 1992, and by the chairman of the National Defence Commission from 1992 until 2012.

In 2012, the position of chairman of the National Defence Commission was replaced by the First Chairman of the National Defence Commission following an amendment to the 1972 Constitution that enshrined Kim Jong-il as eternal chairman of the National Defence Commission after his death in 2011. The same amendment also mandated that the National Defence Commission also consisted of vice chairmen and members, which were elected by the Supreme People's Assembly based on the proposal of the first chairman of the National Defence Commission.

Among the departments that are known in the NDC were:
Administration Department
Foreign Affairs Department
Reconnaissance General Bureau
Policy Department

Security agencies and organizations that subordinated to the Commission:
Ministry of People's Armed Forces
Ministry of People's Security
Korean People's Army
Ministry of State Security (North Korea)

Members

The following are the members of the National Defence Commission at the time of its dissolution on 29 June 2016:

See also

 Government of North Korea
 Military of North Korea
 National Defense Council of East Germany

References

Further reading
 

National Defence Commission
Politics of North Korea
Military of North Korea
Government agencies of North Korea
North Korea
1972 establishments in North Korea
2016 disestablishments in North Korea